Chhim is a village in Lebanon.

People
 Chhim Siek Leng, Cambodian politician
 Chhim Sothy (born 1969), Cambodian painter and sculptor